Castanea × neglecta, the chinknut, is a named hybrid chestnut tree; it is a cross between Castanea dentata (American chestnut) and Castanea pumila (Allegany chinquapin). It was first formally named by Louis-Albert Dode in 1908. The chinknut is native to the southeastern United States.

References

neglecta
Endemic flora of the United States
Plants described in 1908